Alyam Alyam O les jours, a.k.a. Oh the Days!, is a 1978 Moroccan drama film.

Synopsis 
Following his father's death, Abdelwahad, a young man, has to take his place as head of the family. His presence is crucial to the family unit, especially as he has to provide for his seven brothers. Hlima, his mother and a woman of exemplary strength and nature, also fully plays her role. When Abdelwahad tells her that he wishes to leave to work in France, she tries to talk him out of it. He no longer can bear the life of young people in the countryside. He refuses to be a poor man without a future and applies for a work permit in France.

Awards 
 Grand prize 1978 Mannheim-Heidelberg International Film Festival
 Taormina 1978
 FESPACO 1979
 CICAE
 Cartago
 Damasco
 FIFEF

External links 

 
 ALyam ALyam on Cinefiches.com
 Critique de Alyam Alyam on critikat.com

1978 films
Moroccan drama films